Amaury Bellenger (born 14 August 1998) is a French field hockey playerwho plays as a defender or midfielder for Belgian Hockey League club Uccle Sport and the French national team.

Club career
Bellenger first played for Amiens before he joined Racing Club de France in 2016. In 2020 he left France to play in Belgium for Orée. After two seasons at Orée he left them for another Brussels club Uccle Sport.

International career

Under–21
Amaury Bellenger made his debut for the French U–21 team in 2017 at the EuroHockey Junior Championship II in Saint Petersburg.

Les Bleus
Bellenger also made his debut for Les Bleus in 2017 during a test series against Germany in Hamburg.

He has since gone on to win a gold medal in the 2018–19 FIH Hockey Series in Le Touquet. He was most recently names in the national squad for season three of the FIH Pro League.

References

External links
 
 

1998 births
Living people
French male field hockey players
Male field hockey midfielders
Male field hockey defenders
Men's Belgian Hockey League players
Place of birth missing (living people)